Crowe-Garritt House is a historic home located at Hanover, Jefferson County, Indiana. The original section was built about 1824, with later additions and modifications.  It is a two-story, rectangular wood-frame vernacular dwelling with a two-story verandah.  The house was the residence of John Finley Crowe, founder of Hanover College from 1824 to 1860.

It was listed on the National Register of Historic Places in 1980.

References

Houses on the National Register of Historic Places in Indiana
Houses completed in 1824
Houses in Jefferson County, Indiana
National Register of Historic Places in Jefferson County, Indiana